Somdabésma, also spelt Somdabesma, is a commune in the Andemtenga Department of Kouritenga Province in the Centre-Est region of Burkina Faso. It had a population of 322 in 2006.

In the 2006 census, Somdabésma was included as a neighbourhood of Andemtenga but was also listed as a separate settlement.

Demographics

References 

Populated places in the Centre-Est Region